Straight to the Point may refer to:

 Straight to the Point (Atlantic Starr album), 1979
 Straight to the Point (Art Porter Jr. album), 1993
 Straight to the Point (Damion Hall album), 1994